Daryl Lamon Terrell (born January 25, 1975) is a former American football offensive lineman in the National Football League for the New Orleans Saints, the Jacksonville Jaguars, and Washington Redskins. He played college football at Jones County Junior College and the University of Southern Mississippi. Terrell attended Heidelberg High School in Heidelberg, Mississippi.

Professional career

Baltimore Ravens
Terrell signed with the Baltimore Ravens as an undrafted free agent following the 1997 NFL Draft, but was released on July 22, 1997.

New Orleans Saints
Terrell played from 1999 to 2001 with the New Orleans Saints. He appeared in 44 games with the Saints, starting eleven. He also played with the Amsterdam Admirals of NFL Europe in 1999.

Jacksonville Jaguars
Terrell signed with the Jacksonville Jaguars on June 3, 2002. He was released by the Jaguars on February 27, 2003 and re-signed on February 28, 2003. He was released by the Jaguars on August 30, 2003. Terrell appeared in nine games with the Jaguars.

Washington Redskins
Terrell was signed by the Washington Redskins on December 3, 2003. He was released by the Redskins on December 5, 2003. Terrell was re-signed by the Redskins on December 9, 2003. He was released on September 5, 2004. He appeared in three games for the Redskins.

References

External links
Just Sports Stats

1975 births
Living people
People from Jasper County, Mississippi
Players of American football from Mississippi
African-American players of American football
American football offensive linemen
Jones County Bobcats football players
Southern Miss Golden Eagles football players
Amsterdam Admirals players
New Orleans Saints players
Jacksonville Jaguars players
Washington Redskins players
21st-century African-American sportspeople
20th-century African-American sportspeople